Badaling Town is a town on the southwestern part of Yanqing District of Beijing. It borders Kangzhuang and Dayushu Towns to its north, Jingzhuang Town to its east, Nankou Town to its southeast, and Donghuayuan Town to its west. It was home to 10,024 people as of 2020.

The name originates from Badaling, a famous section of the Great Wall of China that is located on the south of the town.

Geography 
Badaling Town is at the foothill of Badaling site, with around 70% of the town being mountainous terrain. Beijing–Baotou railway, Badaling Expressway, National Highway 110 and Beijing–Lhasa Expressway all pass through parts of the town.

History

Administrative divisions 
In 2021, Badaling Town had direct jurisdiction over 16 subdivisions, more specifically 1 communities and 15 villages. They are listed in the table below:

Landmark 

 Badaling

Gallery

See also 

 List of township-level divisions of Beijing

References 

Yanqing District
Towns in Beijing